is a Japanese Seinen slice of life comedy webmanga series written and illustrated by Aoi Ikebe. Published since 2014 by Shogakukan, the manga is serialized on the site of the seinen web magazine  and has been compiled into four tankōbon volumes. It was adapted into a Japanese television drama series that will air on  starting on October 25, 2016.

Volumes
1 (May 12, 2015)
2 (February 12, 2016)
3 (October 19, 2016)
4 (June 12, 2017)

Cast
Aoi Morikawa
Issei Takahashi

Reception
The manga was number ten on the 2016 Kono Manga ga Sugoi! Top 20 Manga for Female Readers survey.

See also
Tsukuroi Tatsu Hito, another manga series by the same author

References

Shogakukan manga
NHK original programming
Japanese television dramas based on manga
Comics adapted into television series
2016 Japanese television series debuts
Japanese comedy webcomics
2010s webcomics
Webcomics in print
Seinen manga
Slice of life anime and manga